Qiupalong is a genus of extinct ornithomimid theropods from the Late Cretaceous of what is now China and Canada.
 
The type specimen, holotype HGM 41HIII-0106, preserves partial hips and hindlimbs, and was named and described in 2011. The team describing it, Xu et al., found it to represent a new taxon, which they gave the binomial Qiupalong henanensis. The genus name comes from the Qiupa Formation, where the specimen comes from, and the Chinese word long, meaning "dragon". The specific epithet is derived from the taxon's occurrence in the Henan Province. Qiupalong is from the late Late Cretaceous, based on the age of the Qiupa Formation. Qiupalong is the first definitive Asian ornithomimid from outside of the Gobi Desert and is the southernmost occurrence of Late Cretaceous Ornithomimidae from eastern Asia. Additional specimens, which include vertebrae, forelimbs, hips, hindlimbs, were later described in 2017 from the Belly River Group of Alberta, Canada. They were referred to Qiupalong sp., given that they occurred up to 10 million years before the type material of Qiupalong. These finds suggest that Qiupalong radiated to Asia from Canada.

See also
 Timeline of ornithomimosaur research

References

Paleontology in Alberta
Fossils of China
Fossils of Canada
 Dinosaur Park fauna
Late Cretaceous dinosaurs of North America
Late Cretaceous dinosaurs of Asia
Ornithomimids
Fossil taxa described in 2011
Taxa named by Lü Junchang
Paleontology in Henan